The 2020–21 Atlantic Coast Conference men's basketball season began with practices in October 2020, followed by the start of the 2020–21 NCAA Division I men's basketball season in November. Conference play started in December 2020 and concluded in March with the 2021 ACC men's basketball tournament at Greensboro Coliseum in Greensboro, North Carolina. The season marked the 67th season of Atlantic Coast Conference basketball.

The Virginia Cavaliers won the regular season title with a conference record of 13–4.  Georgia Tech won the ACC tournament over Florida State.

Head coaches

Coaching changes 

Wake Forest fired Danny Manning after six seasons, where he posted a 78–111 record.  On April 30, 2020, the Demon Deacons hired Steve Forbes as his replacement.
Boston College fired Jim Christian in the middle of the season, after leading the team to a 3–13 record.  Christian's overall record with Boston College was 78–132 and 26–94 in ACC play.  Scott Spinelli served as interim coach until the end of the season.  After the season Earl Grant was hired as the new head coach.

Coaches 

Notes:
 Year at school includes 2020–21 season.
 Overall and ACC records are from the time at current school and are through the end of the 2019–20 season.
 NCAA tournament appearances are from the time at current school only.
 NCAA Final Fours and championship include time at other schools

Preseason

Preseason watchlists
Below is a table of notable preseason watch lists.

Preseason polls

ACC preseason media poll

The preseason media poll and preseason All-ACC teams were announced at a virtual tipoff event that was held on November 11 and November 12. 155 media members voted on the preseason poll and preseason All-ACC teams.

Preseason poll
First-place votes shown in parenthesis.
 Virginia (97) – 2214
 Duke (34) – 2146
 Florida State (15) – 1973
 North Carolina (7) – 1933
 Louisville (2) – 1693
 Syracuse – 1234
 Miami – 1223
 NC State – 1149
 Georgia Tech – 1147
 Clemson – 1057
 Virginia Tech – 794
 Notre Dame – 769
 Pitt – 635
 Boston College – 404
 Wake Forest – 229

Preseason All-ACC teams

ACC preseason player of the year 
Garrison Brooks – North Carolina (102)
Sam Hauser – Virginia  (24)
M. J. Walker – Florida State  (10)
Wendell Moore Jr. – Duke (7)
Aamir Simms – Clemson (5)
Matthew Hurt – Duke (3)
Chris Lykes – Miami (3)
Kihei Clark – Virginia (1)

ACC preseason rookie of the year
Scottie Barnes – Florida State (64)
Jalen Johnson – Duke (60)
Caleb Love – North Carolina (9)
Day'Ron Sharpe – North Carolina (6)
D. J. Steward – Duke (4)
Reece Beekman – Virginia (3)
Jeremy Roach – Duke (3)
RJ Davis – North Carolina (3)
Mark Williams – Duke (2)
Cam Hayes – NC State (1)

Regular season

Rankings

Conference matrix
This table summarizes the head-to-head results between teams in conference play. Each team will play 20 conference games, and at least 1 against each opponent.  The full conference schedule was announced on November 10, 2020.

Player of the week
Throughout the conference regular season, the Atlantic Coast Conference offices named one or two Players of the week and one or two Freshmen of the week.

Records against other conferences
2020–21 records against non-conference foes as of (Feb. 24, 2021). Records shown for regular season only.

Postseason

ACC tournament

The 2021 Atlantic Coast Conference basketball tournament was originally scheduled to be hosted at the Capital One Arena in Washington, D.C. However, due to the ongoing COVID-19 pandemic, the tournament was moved to the Greensboro Coliseum in Greensboro, North Carolina, on November 24, 2020.  The Capital One Arena will host the tournament in 2024.

NCAA tournament

National Invitation Tournament

Honors and awards

All-Americans

To earn "consensus" status, a player must win honors based on a point system computed from the four different all-America teams. The point system consists of three points for first team, two points for second team and one point for third team. No honorable mention or fourth team or lower are used in the computation. The top five totals plus ties are first team and the next five plus ties are second team.

ACC Awards

Source:

NBA draft

The ACC had seven players selected in the 2021 NBA draft.  Over the last eight years (2014–2021) the ACC leads all conferences with forty nine first-round selections.

Attendance

Due to the COVID-19 pandemic, attendance was limited at all stadiums for the season.  Depending on state regulations, some universities did not allow any fans while some universities operated under reduced total capacity.

References